This is a list of Muslim comedians based in Muslim-minority countries:

Aamer Rahman (born 1982) – Australia
Aasif Mandvi (born 1966) – United Kingdom, United States
Abdullah Afzal – United Kingdom
Ali "Ali Official" Shahalom (born 1993) – United Kingdom
Ali Hassan - Canada
Aman Ali (born 1985) – United States
Azhar Usman (born 1975) – United States
Ali "Baba Ali" Ardekani (born 1975) – United States
Bilal Zafar (born 1991) – United Kingdom
Dave Chappelle (born 1973) – United States
Dean Obeidallah (born 1969) – United States
Guz Khan (Guzzy Bear) (born 1986) – United Kingdom
Hasan Minhaj (born 1985) – United States
Jay Shareef (born 1982) – United Kingdom
Jeff Mirza (born 1964) – United Kingdom
Mohammed Amer (born 1981) – United States
Nabil Abdul Rashid (born 1987) – United Kingdom
Nazeem Hussain (born 1986) – Australia
Omar Regan (born 1975) – United States
Bryant Reginald "Preacher" Moss (born 1967) – United States
Prince Abdi (born 1982) – United Kingdom
 Colin Bart
 Austin Janke 
 Baby Mac
 Andrew Pete
 Justin Comet
 Grizz
Riaad Moosa (born 1977) – South Africa
Sadia Azmat (born 1987) – United Kingdom
Shaista Aziz (born 1978) – United Kingdom
Shazia Mirza (born 1977) – United Kingdom
Tez Ilyas (born 1983) – United Kingdom

See also
 Humour in Islam